Highland School, also known as Highland Graded School, is a historic school building located at Hickory, Catawba County, North Carolina. It was built in 1921, and is a two-story, brick building with hipped slate roof in the Classical Revival style. It has a projecting nine-bay central pavilion. A brick "gymtorium"(which has since been torn down) and lunchroom building was built in 1950 and connected by a covered walkway.  It has since been converted into the Highland School Apartments.

It was listed on the National Register of Historic Places in 1990.

References

Hickory, North Carolina
School buildings on the National Register of Historic Places in North Carolina
School buildings completed in 1921
Neoclassical architecture in North Carolina
Buildings and structures in Catawba County, North Carolina
National Register of Historic Places in Catawba County, North Carolina
1921 establishments in North Carolina